

Cabinet

Sources

Government of South Africa
Executive branch of the government of South Africa
Cabinets of South Africa
1938 establishments in South Africa
1943 disestablishments in South Africa
Cabinets established in 1938
Cabinets disestablished in 1943